Ohanet is an industrial village in the commune of In Amenas, in In Amenas District, Illizi Province, Algeria.

References

Neighbouring towns and cities

Populated places in Illizi Province